Francesco Ruopolo (born 10 March 1983) is an Italian former footballer who played as a forward. He spent most of his career in the 2nd highest division of Italian football, Serie B.

Club career

Parma
Born in Aversa, Campania region, Ruopolo started his career at Emilia–Romagna side Parma. He was the member of Primavera under-20 team and in 2002 made his professional debut with Pro Patria of Serie C1, where he was sent on loan for a season.

He was then loaned to Cittadella, again in Serie C1, where he scored six goals. On 1 July 2004, he returned to Parma, playing 21 games (9 in the UEFA Cup, 1 in the Coppa Italia, and 1 in the relegation playoffs) without scoring any goals; however noted by FC Lokomotiv Moscow, that signs him on loan for the 2005 Russian season. He played seven Russian league matches for Lokomotiv, made two substitution appearances in UEFA Champions League third qualifying round, and started 4 games and made 2 substitution appearances in UEFA Cup, scored two goals against S.K. Brann and Maccabi Petah Tikva FC. He returned to Parma in January 2006, and made six more Serie A appearances and 1 more at Cup for the Gialloblu.

Triestina & AlbinoLeffe
In July 2006, Ruopolo was signed by Serie B club Triestina in co-ownership deal, but he failed to impress in Trieste and moved to AlbinoLeffe in January 2007 in another co-ownership deal. He scored 8 league goals for AlbinoLeffe in his first season, and the club decided to buy him outright. He then scored an average of 10 Serie B goals a season in the next 3 seasons for the Province of Bergamo based side.

Atalanta
On 5 July 2010, he moved to cross-town "rival" Atalanta Bergamo, which they shared the same stadium on free transfer. He signed a 3-year contract. Atalanta Bergamo was relegated from Serie A in May 2010 and had sold numbers of players to AlbinoLeffe in previous seasons. In the 2010–11 season, Ruopolo played 31 matches and scored 8 times for the Dea.

In May 2012, Atalanta received two penalty points and a €25,000 fine as several players, including Ruopolo, had been accused of match fixing.

Padova & football scandal
In July 2011, Ruopolo was moved to Calcio Padova on free transfer. He was banned for 16 months after plea bargain for involvement in 2011–12 Italian football scandal. He was released by Padova in July 2012.

International career
During the "Festival International Espoirs de Toulon et du Var" in 2003, Ruopolo scored one goal against Portugal in the final of the tournament.

References

External links
 Profile at La Gazzetta dello Sport (2007–08)  
 Profile at La Gazzetta dello Sport (2009–10)  
 
 
 
 Profile at AIC.Football.it    
 

Italian footballers
Italy youth international footballers
Italian expatriate footballers
Serie A players
Serie B players
Serie C players
Serie D players
Eccellenza players
Russian Premier League players
Parma Calcio 1913 players
Aurora Pro Patria 1919 players
A.S. Cittadella players
FC Lokomotiv Moscow players
U.S. Triestina Calcio 1918 players
U.C. AlbinoLeffe players
Atalanta B.C. players
Calcio Padova players
Association football forwards
Expatriate footballers in Russia
Italian expatriate sportspeople in Russia
People from Aversa
1983 births
Living people
Footballers from Campania
Sportspeople from the Province of Caserta